Cortex is a 2008 French crime film directed by Nicolas Boukhrief.

Cast 
 André Dussollier - Charles Boyer
 Marthe Keller - Carole Rothmann
 Julien Boisselier - Thomas Boyer
 Pascal Elbé - Docteur Chenot
 Claude Perron - Béatrice Monnier
 Serge Renko - Jérémy
 Claire Nebout - Sandra
 Chantal Neuwirth - Francine
  - Diane
 Aurore Clément - Marie
 Gianni Giardinelli - Ludo

References

External links 

2000s crime films
French crime films
2000s French films